"Hands," sometimes known as "White Hands," was a controversial political advertisement that aired on television during the 1990 United States Senate election in North Carolina by the political campaign of Jesse Helms criticizing his opponent, Harvey Gantt, for being in favor of racial quotas. The advertisement is considered to be an important factor in Helms's narrow victory over Gantt and was written and produced by Alex Castellanos.

The advertisement shows the hands of a white man in a plaid shirt reading and then crumpling up a job rejection letter while a voiceover says, "You needed that job, and you were the best qualified. But they had to give it to a minority because of a racial quota. Is that really fair?" The advertisement compared Helms to Gantt by saying that Gantt was "for racial quotas" and that Helms was against them. In particular, it accused Gantt of supporting "Ted Kennedy's racial quota law."

References

Jesse Helms
Political campaign advertisements
1990s television commercials
Ted Kennedy
Conservative media in the United States